A referendum on reinstating the post of Prime Minister was held in Senegal on 22 February 1970, after the post had been abolished in a referendum in 1963. The result was 99.96% of voters in favour of the change, with a 95.2% turnout. Following the referendum, Abdou Diouf was appointed to the post on 26 February.

Results

References

1970 referendums
1970
1970 in Senegal